Lokha is a rural locality (a selo) in Baydarovskoye Rural Settlement, Nikolsky District, Vologda Oblast, Russia. The population was 2 as of 2002.

Geography 
Lokha is located 21 km northeast of Nikolsk (the district's administrative centre) by road. Bolshoy Dvor is the nearest rural locality.

References 

Rural localities in Nikolsky District, Vologda Oblast